William Mike Campbell (May 9, 1922 – June 16, 1998) was an American football player and coach. He was a long-time assistant of Darrell Royal, first at Mississippi State, then Washington, and mostly Texas.

A native of Memphis, Tennessee, Campbell played college football at the University of Mississippi and was drafted in the 32nd round of the 1946 NFL Draft by the Washington Redskins, but chose not to play professional football. He began coaching soon after his playing career, becoming highly successful in the Mississippi High School ranks at Gulf Coast Military Academy, Canton, and Vicksburg.

He was hired by then-Mississippi State coach Royal in 1955, and went with him to Washington, and later Texas. In 1967, he was placed in charge of the Longhorn defense, and in 1974 was named assistant head coach.

After Royal's retirement in 1976, Fred Akers was chosen over Campbell as Royal's successor, a decision that was a source of controversy among Texas fans. Campbell retired from coaching afterwards.

Campbell's twin sons, Mike Jr. and Tom, were defensive starters on Texas' 1969 national championship team.

References

External links
 

1922 births
1998 deaths
American football ends
Mississippi State Bulldogs football coaches
Ole Miss Rebels football players
Texas Longhorns football coaches
Washington Huskies football coaches
Sportspeople from Memphis, Tennessee
Coaches of American football from Tennessee
Players of American football from Memphis, Tennessee